The Short S.4 Satellite was a small British two-seater sporting monoplane, produced in 1924 to take part in the Air Ministry's Two-Seater Light Aeroplane competition on 27 September of that year.

Design
Design began in July, with only weeks available before the competition, so the monocoque fuselage was of conventional design, with wooden box spars; the ribs however were of duralumin, as were the tailplane, elevators, fin and rudder.
The cantilever wings had a span of 34 ft (10.3 m) and they, the tail and the fuselage were fabric-covered. The Satellite was fitted initially with an ungeared Bristol Cherub engine, with which it had a top speed of  without a passenger.

History
The aircraft was initially fitted with an ungeared Bristol Cherub engine at the Air Ministry's Two-Seater Light Aeroplane competition at Lympne in 1924, where the Satellite was flown by the company's chief test pilot J. Lankester Parker. The engine delivered insufficient power to fly with a passenger, so the Satellite, along with nine of the other 18 entrants, failed to meet the competition's success criteria. It was fitted with a tuned version of the Cherub within the week and on 4 October took part in the Grosvenor Cup race, completing the course and finishing in seventh place. It was later fitted with a geared Cherub II, later still with an ABC Motors Scorpion Mk. II engine, both of which greatly improved its performance.

The Satellite was sometimes irreverently referred to as "Parker's Tin Kettle" because he frequently flew the aircraft.

Specifications

Notes

References 

 
 "The Guild of Aircraft Pilots and Navigators of London 1929 - 2004"
 

1920s British sport aircraft
Short Brothers aircraft
Single-engined tractor aircraft
Mid-wing aircraft
Aircraft first flown in 1924